Kazusa Ogawa (小川 和紗, Ogawa Kazusa, born 16 February 1997) is a Japanese Paralympic judoka. She won one of the bronze medals in the women's 70 kg event at the 2020 Summer Paralympics held in Tokyo, Japan.

References 

Living people
1997 births
Japanese female judoka
Paralympic judoka of Japan
Paralympic bronze medalists for Japan
Paralympic medalists in judo
Judoka at the 2020 Summer Paralympics
Medalists at the 2020 Summer Paralympics
Place of birth missing (living people)
People from Ichihara, Chiba
Sportspeople from Chiba Prefecture
20th-century Japanese women
21st-century Japanese women